The .275 Holland & Holland Magnum is a semi-obsolete rifle cartridge similar to the 7mm Remington Magnum.  Essentially the .275 Holland & Holland Magnum is a necked down shortened variant of the .375 Holland & Holland Magnum. It was introduced by the British company Holland & Holland with the .375 Holland & Holland Magnum that was introduced in 1912 as the .375 Belted Rimless Nitro-Express.  The .375 Holland & Holland Magnum was intended for dangerous African game animals, while the .275 Holland & Holland Magnum was intended for longer range shooting of antelope in Africa and Red Stag in the highlands of Scotland.

History
Aside from the belted case, the .275 H&H was very similar to the .276 Enfield cartridge of the Pattern 1913 Enfield rifle then under development by the British military to replace the Lee–Enfield.  Cordite loadings gave both cartridges a reputation for unpleasant muzzle flash and short barrel life.  Western Cartridge Company offered United States loadings of the .275 H&H Magnum in 1925 with the .300 H&H and the .375 H&H.  The .275 H&H was omitted when Winchester Repeating Arms Company started chambering their Winchester Model 70 rifle for the other two in 1937.  The .275 H&H offered little ballistic advantage over the .270 Winchester with contemporary smokeless powders.  U.S. ammunition production ceased during 1939.

Subsequent developments
Following World War II, independent gunsmiths in the United States began exploring the ballistic possibilities of military surplus IMR 4831 powder salvaged from Oerlikon 20mm cannon cartridges and marketed by Hodgdon Powder Company.  The long range ballistics of wildcat cartridges resulted in commercial availability of the 7×61mm Sharpe & Hart in 1953, and the 7mm Remington Magnum in 1962.  The .275 H&H had been a cartridge ahead of its time.

Holland & Holland continue to supply factory loaded .275 ammunition and the cartridge is occasionally chambered in custom made modern "classic" rifles. 275 H&H enthusiasts have noted that the distinctive "H&H taper" of the case offers some advantages over the 7×61mm and 7mm Rem mag. Namely, more reliable and smoother feeding in bolt-action rifles, and more compact stacking in a box magazine allowing longer overall length of cartridge. With modern powders, the 275 H&H can be handloaded to equal any of the currently available 7mm Magnum chamberings, up to 2.5"(63mm) case length. Correctly headstamped empty brass cases are made by Quality Cartridge Co. USA.

See also
List of rifle cartridges

References

Pistol and rifle cartridges
British firearm cartridges
Holland & Holland cartridges